Out Of My Head is the second album released by New Zealand rock band The D4 in 2005.  A two-disc limited edition version of the album was also released in 2005

Track listing
Original release
"Sake Bomb (English Version)"
"Out Of My Head"
"Feel It Like It"
"What I Want"
"Trust Nobody"
"Stops Me Cold"
"Omertà"
"Out Of Control"
"Too Stupid"
"Do No Right"
"Peepshow"
"Savage"

Limited Edition release

Disc one
"Sake Bomb (English Version)"
"Out Of My Head"
"Feel It Like It"
"What I Want"
"Trust Nobody"
"Stops Me Cold"
"Omertà"
"Out Of Control"
"Too Stupid"
"Do No Right"
"Peepshow"
"Savage"

Bonus Disc
"Sake Bomb (Japanese Version)"
"Rock 'n' Rule"
"Diamond, Ruby, Stone"

The D4 albums
2005 albums
Flying Nun Records albums